The Islington Gazette is a weekly paid-for newspaper covering the borough of Islington in north London, England. It was established in 1856 and was owned by Independent News & Media until the early 21st century when it was bought by Archant.

The Gazette celebrated its 150th birthday on 21 September 2006. It is published weekly on a Thursday, and covers local news in Islington and in neighbouring boroughs such as Hackney and Haringey.

See also
List of newspapers in London

References

External links 
 Islington Gazette - Homepage

1856 establishments in the United Kingdom
Media and communications in the London Borough of Islington
London newspapers
Publications established in 1856